Joshua Morrissey (born March 28, 1995) is a Canadian professional ice hockey defenceman and alternate captain for the Winnipeg Jets of the National Hockey League (NHL). He was selected by the Jets in the first round, 13th overall, of the 2013 NHL Entry Draft.

Playing career

Amateur
As a youth, Morrissey played in the 2007 Quebec International Pee-Wee Hockey Tournament with the Calgary Flames minor ice hockey team. He was selected by the Western Hockey League (WHL)'s Prince Albert Raiders in the first round, sixth overall, of the 2010 WHL Bantam Draft after skating for Calgary Royals Gold, and being named the top bantam defenceman in southern Alberta. Morrissey made his WHL debut in 2010 skating in five games with Prince Albert, spending most of the season with the Calgary Royals midget AAA team, and competing for Team Alberta during the 2011 Canada Winter Games in Halifax, Nova Scotia. He helped lead Alberta to a bronze medal.

In the 2012–13 season, Morrissey led Prince Albert defenceman in points, scoring 15 goals and 32 assists to go with a +14 plus-minus rating and 91 penalty minutes. The Raiders finished with a winning record for the first time since 2003–04.

In the subsequent off-season, Morrissey was drafted by the Winnipeg Jets in the first round, 13th overall, of the 2013 NHL Entry Draft. Prior to the beginning of the 2013–14 season, Morrissey was named captain of the Raiders. On October 3, 2013, the Winnipeg Jets signed him to three-year, two-way contract, although he returned to Prince Albert for the season. He finished as the second-leading scorer in the WHL during the 2013–14 season, recording 28 goals and 45 assists (73 points) in 59 regular season games, along with a +6 plus-minus rating and 59 penalty minutes. The Raiders were fourth in the East Division before being swept by the eventual 2014 Memorial Cup champions, the Edmonton Oil Kings, in the first round.

On December 10, 2014, during the 2014–15 season, Morrissey was traded to the Kelowna Rockets. He would help lead the Rockets to the WHL championship as well as to the final of the 2015 Memorial Cup, which they lost to the Oshawa Generals.

Professional
Morrissey was called-up to Winnipeg's American Hockey League (AHL) affiliate, the St. John's IceCaps, during the 2013–14 season, playing eight regular season games as well as 20 games in the 2014 Calder Cup playoffs. The Jets assigned him to the Manitoba Moose (their new AHL affiliate) the following season, although they briefly called him up late in the season to make his NHL debut in a home game against the Montreal Canadiens on March 5, 2016.

Morrissey scored his first career NHL goal on November 15, 2016, in a 4–0 win over the Chicago Blackhawks. He finished his first full season with the Jets with 6 goals and 20 points in 82 games. During his second season with the Jets, Morrissey recorded 26 points in 81 games to help the Jets qualify for the 2018 Stanley Cup playoffs. During the first round, Morrissey was suspended one game for cross checking Eric Staal of the Minnesota Wild.

On September 12, 2019, Morrissey signed an 8-year, $50 million extension with the Jets, carrying an annual average of $6.25 million. Later, on October 1, 2019, just prior to the start of the 2019–20 NHL season Morrissey was named an alternate captain of the Jets.

International play

Morrissey has represented Canada in several International tournaments, including the IIHF World U18 Championships, the Ivan Hlinka Memorial Tournament and the IIHF World U20 Championships. Morrissey was instrumental in helping the under-18 team win gold at the 2013 IIHF World U18 Championships, as well as the under-20 team at the 2015 World Junior Ice Hockey Championship. He was named to the 2015 World Junior All-Star First Team, finishing with four points and a +9 plus-minus rating.

Career statistics

Regular season and playoffs

International

Awards and honours

References

External links

1995 births
Living people
Canadian ice hockey defencemen
Kelowna Rockets players
Manitoba Moose players
National Hockey League first-round draft picks
Ice hockey people from Calgary
Prince Albert Raiders players
St. John's IceCaps players
Winnipeg Jets draft picks
Winnipeg Jets players